Marquette University is a private Jesuit research university in Milwaukee, Wisconsin. Established by the Society of Jesus as Marquette College on August 28, 1881, it was founded by John Martin Henni, the first Bishop of the diocese of Milwaukee, Wisconsin.

The university was named after 17th-century missionary and explorer Father Jacques Marquette, SJ, with the intention to provide an affordable Catholic education to the area's emerging German immigrant population. Initially an all-male institution, Marquette became the first coeducational Catholic university in the world in 1909 when it began admitting its first female students.

Marquette is part of the Association of Jesuit Colleges and Universities. The university is accredited by the Higher Learning Commission and currently has a student body of about 12,000. It is classified among "R2: Doctoral Universities – High research activity". Marquette is one of the largest Jesuit universities in the United States, and the largest private university in Wisconsin.

Marquette is organized into 11 schools and colleges at its main Milwaukee campus, offering programs in the liberal arts, business, communication, education, engineering, law and various health sciences disciplines. The university also administers classes in suburbs around the Milwaukee area and in Washington, DC. While most students are pursuing undergraduate degrees, the university has over 68 doctoral and master's degree programs, a law school, a dental school (only one in the state), and 22 graduate certificate programs. The university's varsity athletic teams, known as the Golden Eagles, are members of the Big East Conference and compete in the NCAA's Division I in all sports.

Among its current and past faculty and alumni, the university counts at least 43 Fulbright Scholars, six Truman Scholars, six state governors, three U.S. Senators, two Pulitzer Prize winners, two Academy Award winners, Tony Award winners, and two Emmy Award winners.

History

Marquette College
Marquette University was founded  on August 28, 1881, as Marquette College by John Martin Henni, the first Catholic bishop of the Archdiocese of Milwaukee, with the assistance of funding from Belgian businessman Guillaume Joseph DeBuey. The university was named after 17th-century missionary and explorer Father Jacques Marquette. The highest priority of the newly established college was to provide an affordable Catholic education to the area's emerging German immigrant population. The first five graduates of Marquette College received their Bachelor of Arts degrees in 1887. Between 1891 and 1906, the college employed one full-time lay professor, with many classes being taught by master's students. By 1906, Marquette had awarded 186 students the Bachelor of Arts, 38 the Master of Arts, and one student Bachelor of Science.

Marquette University
Marquette College officially became a university in 1907, after it became affiliated with a local medical school and moved to its present location. Johnston Hall, which now houses the university's College of Communication, was the first building erected on the new campus grounds. Marquette University High School, formerly the preparatory department of the university, became a separate institution the same year. In 1908, Marquette opened an engineering college and purchased two law schools, which would ultimately become the foundation of its current law program. Initially an all-male institution, Marquette University became the first coed Catholic university in the world, when it admitted its first female students in 1909. By 1916 its female students had increased to 375; many other Catholic institutions began adopting similar approaches in their enrollments during the 1910s and 1920s.

Marquette acquired the Wisconsin College of Physicians and Surgeons in 1913, leading to the formation of the Marquette University School of Medicine. During the 1920s and again during the post-World War II years, Marquette rapidly expanded, opening a new library, athletics facilities, classroom buildings, and residence halls. The student population increased markedly as well, met by the construction of buildings for the schools of law, business, dentistry, and the liberal arts. Marquette is credited with offering the first degree program specializing in hospital administration in the United States, and graduated the first two students in 1927. Despite the promising growth of the university, financial constraints led to the School of Medicine separating from Marquette in 1967 to become the Medical College of Wisconsin. Marquette's Golden Avalanche football team was disbanded in December 1960, and basketball became the leading spectator sport at the university.

In the 1960s an early fifteenth century French chapel, St. Martin de Seysseul, which was reputedly connected to St. Joan of Arc and which had been transported to the US in the 1920s, was transferred to the campus. It is, unsurprisingly, the oldest building in Wisconsin.

1970s – present

Graduate programs in the liberal arts and sciences, for which planning had begun in the preceding decade, were officially opened in the 1970s. In 1977, the university celebrated the victory of their men's basketball team over the University of North Carolina to win the NCAA Championship title.

In 1994, then-President Albert J. DiUlio made a controversial decision to discontinue the use of the "Warriors" nickname for the university's sports teams, citing growing pressure on schools to end the use of Native American mascots. Backlash from alumni, donors, and students ensued, though the administration and Marquette community eventually settled on the nickname "Golden Eagles". The mascot controversy again boiled over in 2005 when the university's leadership briefly changed the nickname to "the Gold," only to return to the "Golden Eagles" a week later.

During the 1990s, the university invested heavily in the neighborhood surrounding Marquette with its $50 million Campus Circle Project. It also opened a Washington, D.C.-based study center called the Les Aspin Center for Government, named after the former Secretary of Defense. MBA programs and the College of Professional Studies, with programs aimed at adult education, were also founded during the mid-1990s. In 1996, Robert A. Wild was installed as the university's 22nd president and shortly thereafter began a fundraising campaign that culminated in a major campus beautification effort and the construction of several major buildings, including a new space for the School of Dentistry. The university's growth was also marked by increases in overall enrollment and the highest test scores for incoming freshmen to date.

In the early 2000s, Marquette continued to grow, with new residence halls, a library, a School of Dentistry building, and athletics facilities. In 2003 the men's basketball team reached the Final Four, boosting the university's exposure on a national level. Fundraising efforts in the subsequent years helped the university complete its largest-ever capital campaign, the Magis Campaign, which raised over $357 million by 2006.

The two largest donations to Marquette University came within the same academic year. The second-largest gift was given by an anonymous couple who have, over time, donated over $50 million to the university. On December 18, 2006, President Wild announced that the couple donated $25 million to the College of Engineering.  Less than five months later, on May 4, 2007, Marquette announced a $51 million gift from Raymond and Kathryn Eckstein that would directly benefit the Marquette University School of Law. The gift was the largest amount ever given to a Wisconsin university.

During the Fall 2013 semester, former Marquette president Robert A. Wild returned to Marquette University as interim president following the resignation of his successor and 22nd president of Marquette, Scott Pilarz. Dr. Michael R. Lovell, the former chancellor of the University of Wisconsin–Milwaukee, took over as president on July 1, 2014, following Wild's interim term. Lovell is the first layperson to serve as Marquette's president, as all previous presidents of the university were Catholic clergymen.

On February 28, 2022, the Marquette board of trustees approved an updated university seal and motto. The change was aimed to "reflect Marquette's history, tradition, and catholic, Jesuit mission, and more accurately depict the role of the Indigenous nations that guided Father Marquette on his journey". The updated seal removes an image depicting Fr. Marquette in a canoe pointing the way forward for a Native American guide and replaces it with an image of a river splitting into three, representing the Milwaukee, the Menomonee, and the Kinnickinnic rivers, and three stalks of wild rice in the foreground, to represent the Potawatomi, Menominee, and Ho-Chunk nations, who remain in the Milwaukee area today. With the seal change also came a change to the university's motto. The motto changed from "Numen Flumenque", meaning "God and the (Mississippi) River" to the Jesuit motto "Ad majorem Dei gloriam", meaning "For the greater glory of God".

Controversies

On May 16, 1968, African-American students withdrew from Marquette University in a protest against what they called its "institutional racism". The students demanded the immediate hiring of an African-American administrator. A rally at the student union culminated in the arrest of seven people who refused to leave the building after closing. On May 17, Marquette moved toward the hiring of an African-American administrator to end the campus protest.

In April 2010, Marquette University offered a position as dean of the College of Arts and Sciences to Jodi O'Brien, an openly lesbian professor at another Jesuit university, Seattle University. On May 2, Marquette rescinded the offer over concerns about her scholarly writing as it related to Catholic teaching. O'Brien had published works on lesbian sex and same-sex marriage. Several faculty members at Marquette said the decision raised concerns about academic freedom. Faculty and students from both universities protested Marquette's decision.

On June 21, 2011, a 19-year-old Marquette student reported being raped by an athlete. No report was taken by university officers and the city police were not notified. Marquette University acknowledged that failing to notify police was a violation of state law and that the university had ignored its reporting obligations for 10 years. In at least two cases, the lapse played a role in prosecutors declining to press charges. Marquette had held an administrative hearing on another sexual assault allegation in January 2011. However, by the time the report was filed with police, too much time had elapsed to conduct a proper investigation. In 2016, independent research from The State of Education deemed Marquette University as the least sexually healthy college in the nation.

In the fall of 2014, an undergraduate student disagreed with how a course instructor dealt with the topic of gay rights. After class, the student recorded a conversation with the course instructor in which the course instructor stated that she would not tolerate homophobic, racist, or sexist comments in class. After taking the issue to the university, the student claimed to be shut out and told his academic professor, John McAdams, who posted about it on his personal blog. McAdams was put on suspension for refusing to apologize for his blog post, earning MU a spot on the Foundation for Individual Rights in Education's 2016 "10 Worst Colleges for Free Speech". McAdams filed suit against the university for the termination of his contract, and after subsequent appeal the Wisconsin Supreme Court ruled in favor of McAdams, and that the university owed him immediate reinstatement, back pay, and damages.

Academics

The university includes 11 schools and colleges: the Helen Way Klingler College of Arts and Sciences, the College of Business Administration, the J. William and Mary Diederich College of Communication, the College of Education, the College of Engineering, the College of Health Sciences, the College of Nursing, the College of Professional Studies, the Graduate School, the Marquette University School of Dentistry, and the Marquette University Law School. Marquette's largest college by enrollment is the Helen Way Klingler College of Arts and Sciences.

Admissions

Undergraduate 

The 2022 annual ranking of U.S. News & World Report categorizes Marquette University as "more selective". For the Class of 2026 (enrolled fall 2022), Marquette University received 15,883 applications and accepted 13,851 (87.2%). Of those accepted, 1,983 enrolled, a yield rate (the percentage of accepted students who choose to attend the university) of 14.3%. Marquette University's freshman retention rate is 89.5%, with 82.5% going on to graduate within six years.

Of the 30% of enrolled freshmen in 2022 who submitted ACT scores; the middle 50 percent Composite score was between 26 and 31. Of the 17% of the incoming freshman class who submitted SAT scores; the middle 50 percent Composite scores were 1180-1350. 

Marquette University is a college-sponsor of the National Merit Scholarship Program and sponsored 1 Merit Scholarship awards in 2020. In the 2020–2021 academic year, 2 freshman students were National Merit Scholars.

Rankings

For 2021, Marquette was ranked tied for 88th overall among 389 undergraduate programs for national universities by U.S. News & World Report, and tied for 18th out of 73 in "Best Undergraduate Teaching", tied for 42nd out of 83 "Most Innovative Schools", and 52nd out of 180 "Best Value Schools". The magazine also named Marquette tied for the 56th best university for military veterans and tied for 284th out of 389 in "Top Performers on Social Mobility" in its 2021 rankings.

The Center for College Affordability & Productivity in Washington, D.C., ranked Marquette 69th overall, based on professor reviews, graduation rates, student grants, and the success of graduates in their vocations. Forbes ranked Marquette 83rd among research universities and 157th overall in 2016. In 2015, the QS World University Rankings placed Marquette at 701+ overall for universities worldwide.

In its 2020 edition, Princeton Review named Marquette as one of the "Best 386 Colleges in the U.S." and one of the best Midwestern schools. In 2018, Kiplinger's Personal Finance magazine ranked Marquette 75th in the country among the 100 best value private universities.

College and program rankings

College of Arts & Sciences
For 2021, U.S. News & World Report ranked several of the college's graduate degree programs. Biological sciences at Marquette ranked as tied for 213th overall, chemistry was tied for 145th, and computer science was tied for 133rd. Graduate clinical psychology ranked tied for 120th, English ranked tied for 85th, history was tied for 114th, and psychology ranked 131st.

College of Business Administration and the Graduate School of Management
U.S. News & World Report ranked Marquette's part-time MBA program tied for 52nd out of 272 schools for 2021.

College of Education
The Marquette University College of Education's graduate degree was ranked tied for 112th out of 393 by U.S. News & World Report for 2021.

College of Engineering
Marquette's undergraduate engineering program was ranked tied for the 118th best out of 206 schools whose highest degree is a doctorate for 2021.

College of Health Sciences
The physical therapy program was ranked tied for 13th best in the nation for 2021 by U.S. News & World Report, and the physician assistant program was ranked tied for 26th. The speech-language pathology program was ranked tied for 55th in the nation for 2021 as well.

College of Nursing
For 2021, U.S. News & World Report listed the Marquette University College of Nursing graduate program as tied for the 69th best in the country, while its nursing-midwifery program was tied for 17th nationally.

Law School
The Marquette University Law School was ranked tied for 102nd out of 198 by U.S. News & World Report for 2021, with its dispute resolution program ranking tied for tenth out of 98.

Campus

Marquette is located on a  campus in the near downtown Milwaukee neighborhood of University Hill, on the former Wisconsin State Fairgrounds. Lake Michigan is roughly one mile east of the edge of campus. The campus stretches 12 blocks east to west and 5 blocks north to south. Wisconsin Avenue, a major thoroughfare in Milwaukee, bisects the campus, placing academic buildings on the south side, and residence halls and other offices and buildings on the north side. Named after the university, the Marquette Interchange, where Interstate Highways 43 and 94 intersect, is also close to campus.

Outside of the main campus, Marquette also operates an athletics facility called Valley Fields, which is home to stadiums for track and field, lacrosse, and soccer teams. Located in the Menomonee Valley, the facility sits along the banks of the Menomonee River, about one mile south of the main Marquette University campus. The university also owns property in Washington, D.C., which houses its Les Aspin Center for Government, a program designed for students interested in careers in public service. The Marquette College of Business Administration hosts off-campus graduate classes in Waukesha and Kohler, Wisconsin, though it does not own these classroom properties.

In 2016, Marquette University's College of Nursing opened a satellite campus in Pleasant Prairie, Wisconsin, for the blended Direct Entry MSN program, where students complete coursework online and spend time on campus learning skills and participating in simulation labs.

In January 2017, the university revealed plans for a $600m project to transform the Milwaukee campus including a BioDiscovery District, Innovation Alley, a recreational and wellness facility, residence hall, and sports research facility.

Student life

Demographics

Marquette's 11,749 students come from all 50 states, various U.S. territories, and represent more than 65 countries. Of these, 8,293 are undergraduates and 3,456 are graduate and professional students. Twenty-nine percent of undergraduate students are from Wisconsin and thirty-seven percent come from Illinois. Marquette University also has a moderate number of law students and dental students.

The student body is fifty-three percent female and sixty-eight percent identify themselves as Catholic. The retention rate for Marquette is high, with about ninety percent of students returning for their sophomore year.

Marquette administers an Educational Opportunity Program (EOP) – a federally funded TRIO program that is intended to motivate and enable low-income and first-generation students whose parents do not have baccalaureate degrees, to enter and succeed in higher education. Eligible students, who have potential for success and enrolling at Marquette, are provided with a pre-enrollment summer program, a network of supportive services, financial aid assistance, academic counseling, specialized courses, seminars, tutoring, and educational and career counseling.

Residence halls

Throughout the years, Marquette has absorbed many existing buildings in the area, especially for use as residence halls. Some examples of absorbed buildings include Charles Cobeen Hall, a former hotel, and M. Carpenter Tower, an Art Deco building, both constructed in the 1920s on 11th Street that have been converted into undergraduate residence halls. Glenn Humphrey Hall, a student residence hall that prior to the 2015–16 school year served as a university apartment building, was once the Children's Hospital of Wisconsin. David Straz Tower, formerly the Downtown Milwaukee YMCA, is now a residence hall, recreation center, and administrative office building. Mashuda Hall, a sophomore dorm, was once the Coach House Motor Inn, where The Beatles stayed during their tour in 1964. Abbottsford Hall served as The Abbottsford Hotel until the university purchased it for use as graduate apartments. It was converted into a freshman residence hall prior to the 2005–2006 academic year. The university also purchased the Marquette Apartments complex in 2008, which was remodeled as a sophomore residence hall prior to the 2009–2010 academic year and renamed McCabe Hall. As of the 2015–16 academic year, McCabe Hall is now university apartments. Additionally, the university purchased The Marq, an apartment complex on the west side of campus, in 2017.

Of the nine current student residence halls, only three (O'Donnell Hall, Schroeder Hall, and McCormick Hall) were built by the university. McCormick Hall was razed following the 2018–19 academic year and replaced by Wild Commons, a residence hall for freshman and sophomore students named after former university president Robert Wild. A few weeks after opening for the 2018–19 academic year, Wild requested his name be removed from the building due to his mishandling of accusations of sexual abuse of minors against three Jesuits under his jurisdiction during his time as Provincial Superior of the Chicago Province of the Society of Jesus from 1985 to 1991. It has since been renamed The Commons.

Athletics

The Golden Eagle is Marquette's mascot and the school colors are Marquette blue and Marquette gold, with powder blue incorporated in the 1970s and late 2000s. Marquette is a Division I member of the NCAA and competes in the Big East Conference. The university has 11 varsity teams: basketball, cross-country, men's golf, soccer, track & field, tennis, and women's volleyball. In 2013, Marquette began competition in varsity men's and women's lacrosse as a member of the Big East. Football was discontinued by the university after the 1960 season for financial reasons. Since joining the Big East in 2005, the Golden Eagles have won conference championships in men's basketball, men's golf, women's soccer, men's and women's track & field, and men's lacrosse. Marquette's athletic rivals include Syracuse, Cincinnati, DePaul, Louisville, Notre Dame, and Wisconsin. In 2009, because of Marquette, Milwaukee was named by CNN as one of America's great college basketball towns.

Mascot and nickname
Marquette's intercollegiate athletic teams were the "Warriors" from May 1954 to July 1994, when the nickname was changed to the "Golden Eagles," on the grounds that previous logos had been disrespectful to Native Americans. The football team was known as "Golden Avalanche" through its final season in 1960, and other teams were known as "Warriors," "Blue and Gold," and "Hilltoppers". The Marquette Warriors (the nickname that preceded Golden Eagles) won the NCAA Men's Division I Basketball Championship in 1977. In 2004, Marquette began to consider changing the name back to Warriors, but instead the Board of Trustees changed the nickname to simply "Gold". An intensely negative reaction by students, faculty, alumni, and fans led to yet another series of votes, which eventually pitted "Golden Eagles" against "Hilltoppers". Respondents were told in advance that write-in votes for "Warriors" would not be tabulated, although those results were later released, and "Golden Eagles" was restored in June 2005. In July 2020, Marquette Athletics  announced "Iggy" as the name of the Golden Eagle Mascot - named after St. Ignatius of Loyola.

Clubs and organizations

The university has more than 230 student organizations in various fields of interest. This includes Phi Beta Kappa, an academic honors society for arts and sciences students; Alpha Sigma Nu, an international Jesuit honor society, founded at Marquette in 1915; and Psi Chi. Marquette has over 20 student organizations dedicated to community service and/or social awareness. Some of these include Big Brothers Big Sisters, Gay Straight Alliance, Engineers Without Borders, and Empowerment.

Marquette's on-campus security is composed of the Department of Public Safety and Student Safety Program employees. Students on campus use services provided by the two organizations including the LIMO program, an entirely student staffed transportation service, which is the first of its kind in the country.

Greek life

Marquette University is host to 23 Greek organizations and, as of 2009, 10% of the total undergraduate student body is active in Greek life. Sororities are slightly more popular than fraternities, with 11.7% of the female student population involved in Greek life, compared to 7.45% of men. As of 2012, Alpha Phi was Marquette's largest sorority and Kappa Sigma the largest fraternity. Currently, the all-Greek grade point average is higher than the all-university average, and members of Marquette Greek organizations contributed over 5,200 hours of volunteer service to the community during the 2010–11 academic year.

The international engineering sorority Alpha Omega Epsilon was founded at Marquette on November 13, 1983.

Student government
Marquette University Student Government (MUSG) serves as the official voice of the student body to university administration, promotes and sponsors campus events, and supports other student organizations. MUSG was formerly known as the Associated Students of Marquette University (ASMU).

Performing arts

Acting and comedy
Among the various stage performance groups at Marquette are the Studio 013 Refugees, a student improv comedy group. The Refugees perform free shows throughout the year, including a 12-hour outdoor show on campus, and they provide workshops on improv comedy. The Marquette University Players Society (MUPS) is a platform for student-produced theater and performs in a traditional theater setting. In addition to acting, MUPS members also work as stage managers, designers, technicians, ticket sellers, and marketing personnel.

Vocal and dance
The Marquette University Chorus, the longest standing choral organization on campus, is a mixed choir of fifty to sixty men and women who share their time, talents, and passion for music with others at Marquette and throughout the community. There are Men's Choir, Women's Choir, and Chamber Choir. Marquette also has a Gospel Choir and a Liturgical Choir which sings weekly at Mass at Gesu. There are three selective a cappella groups that interested students may try out for: the coed Gold 'n Blues, the all-male Naturals, and the all-female Meladies. Although the a cappella groups are not affiliated with the Marquette University Music Department, they do on and off campus concerts.

Pure Dance is a lyrical and jazz performance group that helps members pursue their interests in dance and choreography in a collegial setting. Dance, Inc. is a group that allows its members to perform in semester showcases, and styles of dance vary. Hype Dance company is primarily a hip-hop organization that helps to cultivate an interest in hip-hop, contemporary, and jazz style dance.

Instrumental
The Marquette University Symphony Orchestra provides members with an opportunity to develop and share musical talents through participation in a large-group setting. There are several band ensembles that students may join. The Symphonic Band is a group designed for students who wish to continue to make music at the collegiate level, but in a relaxed setting. The newly established Wind Ensemble performs high-level wind band repertoire. There are also two jazz bands. Students who are registered and participate actively in the Symphonic Band and Wind Ensemble have the opportunity to participate in the MU Pep Band. The Pep Band plays at all men's and women's basketball home games, continuing during tournament season, when the bands travel with the basketball teams.

Student media

The student newspaper, The Marquette Tribune, founded in 1916, is the official campus newspaper. It is published in print on Tuesdays and Thursdays during the school year. The paper has won regional and national awards for excellence from the Society of Professional Journalists. While most of the 40-person staff are journalism majors, students from varying fields of study write for the paper. A quarterly student-produced magazine, the Marquette Journal, focuses on student life, though formerly the Journal was the school's student literary magazine. Like The Marquette Tribune, the Journal has won awards from the Society of Professional Journalists.

Marquette Radio and MUTV, the student radio and television stations, were launched in the late 1960s to mid-1970s. MUTV airs student-produced programs, including newscasts, sports shows, and entertainment shows. Marquette Radio also airs student-produced shows with focuses on music, sports, news, and talk.

Hilltop was Marquette's university-wide yearbook from 1915 to 1999. The publication, in its 84 years of existence, totaled over 30,000 pages in 82 volumes. Students' color-plate sketches were often highly detailed, humorous or dramatic, and were appropriate examples of contemporary artwork. In April 2006, Marquette's librarians completed a digitally-archived collection of Hilltop.

School songs

The school songs, "The Marquette University Anthem" and the "Marquette University Fight Song," are generally sung by students and alumni during basketball games, accompanied by the pep band. The former is also often played using the carillon bells of the Marquette Hall bell tower. "The Marquette University Anthem," as it was originally known, is now referred to almost exclusively as "Hail Alma Mater"/ The tune was written by Liborius Semmann, a music teacher from Wisconsin.

The Fight Song is more commonly referred to as "Ring Out Ahoya", although the actual meaning of the word "Ahoya" is open to a great deal of debate. One leading theory is that the call of "Ahoya" was often made by sailors on the Potomac river while passing Georgetown University in Washington, D.C., hence Georgetown getting its nickname of "Hoyas". The cheer was then relayed from priests and professors moving between the two Jesuit universities. The lur horn or long tuba of the modern pep band sounds a traditional ship's signal during "Ring Out Ahoya".

People

Alumni

As of April 2013, the Marquette University Alumni Association estimated that there were approximately 110,000 living alumni, all of whom automatically belong to the MUAA. Marquette alumni work in a variety of industries and professions. Some have received Pulitzer Prizes, Fulbright Scholarships, Truman Scholarships, Academy Awards, Emmy Awards, and other honors.

Those in the arts and media include comedian Chris Farley, actor Nicholas D'Agosto, actor Danny Pudi, actor Marc Alaimo, composer Paul W. Whear, actor Anthony Crivello, journalist Gail Collins, actor Don Ameche, sports columnist Steve Rushin, actor Ron Sheridan, Chicago White Sox broadcaster Len Kasper, Academy Award-winning production designer Adam Stockhausen, and Emmy Award-winning costume designer Erin Slattery-Black.

Marquette alumni in the business world include former Sears chairman Edward Brennan, Texas Instruments co-founder Patrick E. Haggerty, and Mary Houghton, founder of ShoreBank. Marcus Lemonis, CEO of Camping World, Good Sam Enterprises, obtained his bachelor's degree at Marquette.

Those involved in politics include U.S. Senator Joseph McCarthy; first Latino member of the Wisconsin State Assembly Pedro Colón; U.S. Representative Gwen Moore; Annette Ziegler, a justice of the Wisconsin Supreme Court; Stephen Murphy III, a District Court Judge for the Eastern District of Michigan; U.S. Ambassadors John F. Tefft and Kenneth M. Quinn; two governors of Guam, Felix and Carlos Camacho; Governor of the Northern Mariana Islands Froilan Tenorio; Senator of Guam Tony Palomo. Former Governor of Wisconsin Scott Walker attended Marquette in the 1980s, but left during his senior year.

Notable athletes who attended Marquette include professional basketball players Dwyane Wade, Jimmy Butler, Maurice Lucas, Jae Crowder, Maurice "Bo" Ellis, Don Kojis, Wesley Matthews, Allie McGuire, Dean Meminger, and Tony Miller. The Philadelphia 76ers coach Glenn "Doc" Rivers and former college basketball coach Rick Majerus both graduated from the school. Olympic medalists include track and field athletes Ralph Metcalfe, Ken Wiesner, John Bennett, speedskater Brian Hansen, and basketball player Frank McCabe.

Marquette alumni in science include George Delahunty, Donald Laub, Robert B. Pinter, Carol Pontzer, and Jeffery D. Molkentin. Economist and writer Michael R. Strain graduated from Marquette.

Faculty
The following is a list of notable members of the Marquette University faculty, both past and present:

 Les Aspin, professor of political science, 1969–1971; Center for Government renamed in his honor
 Michel René Barnes, associate professor of historical theology
 Daniel D. Blinka, law professor and historian
 Virgil Blum, professor of political science
 Chris Bury, journalism instructor, 1979–80; Nightline correspondent
 Margaret Callahan, Dean of the College of Nursing
 Tom Colbert, Assistant Dean of the Marquette Law School (1982–1984), Justice of the Oklahoma Supreme Court (2004–)
 Richard Dickson Cudahy, Judge of the U.S. Court of Appeals
 John A. Decker, Chief Judge of the Wisconsin Court of Appeals
 Paddy Driscoll, NFL player and head coach, MLB player
 Arpad Elo, professor of physics, author of The Rating of Chessplayers, Past and Present
 Stephen M. Engel, professor of political science
 Russ Feingold, U.S. Senator, visiting professor in 2011
Luis Feliciano, Professional Boxer, Super Lightweight Champion
 Janine P. Geske, Justice of the Wisconsin Supreme Court
 Alexander Golitzen, professor of theology, Bishop of Toledo and the Bulgarian Diocese (OCA)
 Arthur Guepe, head coach of the Virginia Cavaliers and Vanderbilt Commodores football teams, Commissioner of the Ohio Valley Conference
 Jack Harbaugh, associate athletic director
 Joseph D. Kearney, Dean of the Law School
 Alice Beck Kehoe, professor emeritus of anthropology
 Joan F. Kessler, Judge of the Wisconsin Court of Appeals
 Jean-Pierre LaFouge, Associate Professor of French
 Timothy R. Lannon, President of Creighton University
 Frank Lazarus, President of the University of Dallas
 William Markowitz, professor of physics (1966–1972)
 John C. McAdams, associate professor of political science
 David Merkow, golfer and golf coach
 Frank Murray, member of the College Football Hall of Fame
 Rev. John E. Naus, various roles
 George New, artist
 Andrei Orlov, associate professor of Christian origins
 Benjamin Percy, visiting assistant professor, author (2004–2007)
 Joseph Perry, Auxiliary Bishop of the Roman Catholic Archdiocese of Chicago
 Michael Phayer, historian
 Francis Paul Prucha, professor emeritus of history
 Rajendra Rathore, chemist
 George Reedy, Dean of the Journalism School
 James Robb, professor of philosophy
 James A. Rutkowski, Wisconsin State Assemblyman
 John P. Schlegel, President of Creighton University
 Charles B. Schudson, Judge of the Wisconsin Court of Appeals
 Bud Selig, Commissioner of Major League Baseball and adjunct faculty member in the Law School
 Nancy Snow, professor of philosophy
 Thomas E. Stidham, NFL assistant coach
 Athan G. Theoharis, professor emeritus of history
 Albert G. Thompson
 Abraham J. Twerski, psychiatrist specializing in substance abuse
 Barbara Ulichny, Wisconsin State Senator
 Francis Wade, professor of philosophy
 Margaret Urban Walker, professor of philosophy
 Benjamin Wiker, ethicist
 Michael Zimmer, computer science

University presidents

 1881–1882: Joseph F. Rigge
 1882–1884: Isidore J. Boudreaux
 1884–1887: Thomas S. Fitzgerald
 1887–1889: Stanislaus P. La Lumiere
 1889–1891: Joseph Grimmelsman
 1891–1892: Rudolph J. Meyer
 1892–1893: Victor Plutten
 1893–1898: Leopold Bushard
 1898–1900: William B. Rogers
 1900–1908: Alexander J. Burrowes
 1908–1911: James McCabe
 1911–1915: Joseph Grimmelsman
 1915–1922: Herbert C. Noonan
 1922–1928: Albert C. Fox
 1928–1936: William M. Magee
 1935–1944: Raphael C. McCarthy
 1944–1948: Peter A. Brooks
 1948–1962: Edward J. O'Donnell
 1962–1965: William F. Kelley
 1965–1990: John P. Raynor
 1990–1996: Albert J. DiUlio
 1996–2011: Robert A. Wild
 2011–2013: Scott R. Pilarz
 2013–2014: Robert A. Wild (interim)
 2014–present: Michael Lovell

See also
 List of Jesuit sites
 List of Jesuit educational institutions

Notes

References

External links

 
 Marquette University Athletics website

 
Educational institutions established in 1881
Jesuit universities and colleges in the United States
Universities and colleges in Milwaukee
Catholic universities and colleges in Wisconsin
Association of Catholic Colleges and Universities
Roman Catholic Archdiocese of Milwaukee
1881 establishments in Wisconsin